Séverine Beltrame (born 14 August 1979) is a retired tennis player from France. She was known as Séverine Brémond during her marriage to her coach, Eric Brémond, from September 2005 to November 2008, and then as Séverine Brémond-Beltrame until the end of 2009. She reverted to her birthname Beltrame in 2010.

Matches
In 2005, Beltrame was selected by the team leader Georges Goven to play with Mary Pierce, Amélie Mauresmo and Nathalie Dechy for the semifinals of the Fed Cup against Spain when teammate Virginie Razzano was injured and players Marion Bartoli and Émilie Loit were suspended.

On 10 July 2006, Beltrame (as Séverine Brémond) achieved a career-high singles ranking of world No. 65 after her success at the 2006 Wimbledon Championships, where she reached the quarterfinal of a Grand Slam event for the first time. After qualifying for the tournament, she defeated No. 10 Patty Schnyder in the second round, Gisela Dulko in the third round, and Ai Sugiyama in the fourth, losing to eventual champion Justine Henin-Hardenne 4–6, 4–6.

Her last event for 2006 was the Bell Challenge in Québec, Canada. Following her run to the semifinals at this event, she broke the top 40 for the first time and landed at No. 38. In February 2007, she achieved her career-high ranking of 34.

Beltrame entered the 2008 US Open as a wildcard, where she beat Julia Görges, Nicole Vaidišová and Tathiana Garbin. She lost to eventual champion Serena Williams (2–6, 2–6) in the fourth round.

She has made the semifinals of the mixed-doubles tournament at Wimbledon of 2007 with Fabrice Santoro.

In May 2013, Beltrame announced that she would be retiring from tennis right after the conclusion of the French Open.

WTA career finals

Doubles: 2 (2 runner-ups)

ITF Circuit finals

Singles: 15 (8–7)

Doubles: 13 (10–3)

Grand Slam singles performance timeline

References

External links
 
 
 
 United Athletes Magazine Interview with Séverine about the sources of motivation.

1979 births
Living people
French female tennis players
Sportspeople from Montpellier